João Carlos Proença Filipe (born 15 December 1972), known as Fusco, is a Portuguese former professional footballer who played as a midfielder.

Club career
Born in Lisbon, Fusco spent his entire professional career with S.C. Beira-Mar, amassing Primeira Liga totals of 54 games and one goal for the club over five seasons. He made his debut in the competition on 21 August 1998, starting and being sent off in a 2–1 away loss against S.C. Braga.

On 19 June 1999, Fusco played the full 90 minutes of the final of the Taça de Portugal, helping the Aveiro side to their first and only major title after the 1–0 defeat of S.C. Campomaiorense. He scored his only goal in the Portuguese top division on 25 February 2001, opening the 2–0 victory at the same adversary and later providing an assist.

Honours
Beira-Mar
Taça de Portugal: 1998–99

References

External links

1972 births
Living people
Footballers from Lisbon
Portuguese footballers
Association football midfielders
Primeira Liga players
Liga Portugal 2 players
Segunda Divisão players
Seixal F.C. players
Louletano D.C. players
S.C. Beira-Mar players
C.D. Pinhalnovense players
G.D. Fabril players